Dippel's oil (sometimes referred to as bone oil) is a nitrogenous by-product of the destructive distillation of bones. A dark, viscous, tar-like liquid with an unpleasant smell, it is named after its inventor, Johann Konrad Dippel. The oil consists mostly of aliphatic chains, with nitrogen functionalities and includes species such as pyrroles, pyridines and nitriles, as well as other nitrogenous compounds.

Dippel's oil had a number of uses which are now mostly obsolete. Its primary use was as an animal and insect repellent. It saw limited use as a chemical warfare harassing agent during the desert campaign of World War II. The oil was used to render wells undrinkable and thus deny their use to the enemy. 
By not being lethal, the oil was claimed to not be in breach of the Geneva Protocol.

See also 
 Neatsfoot oil, another bone-derived oil
 Bone char, what remains after the distillation of the bones

References

Oils
Bone products
Animal fats